Machaerilaemus malleus is a species of louse belonging to the family Menoponidae.

Synonyms:
 Eureum malleus Burmeister, 1838 
 Machaerilaemus bolivianus Carriker, 1944

References

Lice
Insects described in 1874